The Armed Forces of the Russian Federation, commonly referred to as the Russian Armed Forces, are the  military of Russia. In terms of active-duty personnel, they are the world's fifth-largest military force, with 1.15 million and at least two million reserve personnel. The CIA lists branches of service as the Ground Forces, the Navy, and the Aerospace Forces, as well as two independent arms of service: the Strategic Rocket Forces and the Airborne Forces. In addition, the Special Operations Forces Command was established in 2013, with an estimated strength in 2022 of 1,000, possibly with additional supporting staff.

The Russian Armed Forces maintain the world's largest stockpile of nuclear weapons, and possess the world's second-largest fleet of ballistic missile submarines; they are also one of only three national militaries (alongside those of the United States and China) that operate strategic bombers. With certain exceptions, Russian law mandates one year of military service for all male citizens aged 18–27.

In spite of Russia's perceived military strength, as recorded in various assessments, deficiencies have been noted in the country's combat performance on both the tactical and operational scales. According to multiple reports, endemic corruption within the Russian Armed Forces has had a major impact on Russia's ability to effectively project hard power. Amidst the 2022 Russian invasion of Ukraine, severe logistical failures have greatly impacted the operational performance of Russian troops, as different service branches have struggled to coordinate and work together. Continuous shortcomings have led Russia's war effort to suffer extensive setbacks since the initial invasion; the Russian Armed Forces have experienced successive losses of occupied/annexed territory, the large-scale destruction and squandering of their equipment, and a notably high casualty rate. Researchers from the RAND Corporation have observed that Russia continues to struggle with military professionalization.

Directly controlled by the Security Council of Russia, the Russian Armed Forces form part of the country's defence services under Russian law, fulfilling this capacity alongside the Border Guard of the Federal Security Service, the National Guard, the Ministry of Internal Affairs, the Federal Protective Service, the Foreign Intelligence Service, and the Ministry of Emergency Situations.

Service branches
Armed forces under the Ministry of Defence are divided into:
the three "branches of Armed Forces": the Ground Forces, Aerospace Forces, and Navy
the two "separate troop branches": the Strategic Rocket Forces and Airborne Forces
the "special forces of Armed Forces": the Special Operations Forces
the Logistical Support, which has a separate status of its own 
There are additionally two further "separate troop branches", the National Guard and the Border Service. These retain the legal status of "Armed Forces", while falling outside of the jurisdiction of the General Staff of the Armed Forces of the Russian Federation. The National Guard is formed on the basis of the former Internal Troops of Russia. The new structure has been detached from the Ministry of Internal Affairs into a separate agency, directly subordinated to the President of Russia. The Border Service is a paramilitary organization of the Federal Security Service, the country's main internal intelligence agency. Both organizations have significant wartime tasks in addition to their main peacetime activities and operate their own land, air and maritime units.

The number of personnel is specified by decree of the President of Russia. On 1 January 2008, a number of 2,019,629 units, including military of 1,134,800 units, was set. In 2010 the International Institute for Strategic Studies (IISS) estimated that the Russian Armed Forces numbered about 1,027,000 active troops and in the region of 2,035,000 reserves (largely ex-conscripts). As opposed to personnel specified by decree, actual personnel numbers on the payroll was reported by the Audit Chamber of Russia as 766,000 in October 2013.

According to the Stockholm International Peace Research Institute, between 2005–2009 and 2010–2014, Russian exports of major weapons increased by 37 percent; Russia spent $66.4 billion on arms in 2015, then $69.2 billion in 2016, having taken 3rd place (after the U.S. and China). According to the Russian Defence Ministry, the share of modern weaponry in service with Russia's army and fleet amounts to 71.2% with serviceability of weapons at 99% as of 2021.

History

The Soviet Union officially dissolved on 25 December 1991. For the next year various attempts to keep its unity and to transform it into the military of the Commonwealth of Independent States (CIS) failed. Over time, some units stationed in the newly independent republics swore loyalty to their new national governments, while a series of treaties between the newly independent states divided up the military's assets.

Apart from assuming control of the bulk of the former Soviet Internal Troops and the KGB Border Troops, seemingly the only independent defence move the new Russian government made before March 1992 involved announcing the establishment of a National Guard. Until 1995, it was planned to form at least 11 brigades numbering 3,000 to 5,000 each, with a total of no more than 100,000. National Guard military units were to be deployed in 10 regions, including in Moscow (three brigades), (two brigades), and a number of other important cities and regions. In Moscow alone 15,000 personnel expressed their desire to service in the new Russian Army, mostly former Soviet Armed Forces servicemen. In the end, President Yeltsin tabled a decree "On the temporary position of the Russian Guard", but it was not put into practice.

After signing the Belavezha Accords on 21 December 1991, the countries of the newly formed CIS signed a protocol on the temporary appointment of Marshal of Aviation Yevgeny Shaposhnikov as Minister of Defence and commander of the armed forces in their territory, including strategic nuclear forces. On 14 February 1992 Shaposhnikov formally became Supreme Commander of the CIS Armed Forces. On 16 March 1992 a decree by Boris Yeltsin created the Armed Forces of the Russian Federation, the operational control of Allied High Command and the Ministry of Defence, which was headed by President. Finally, on 7 May 1992, Yeltsin signed a decree establishing the armed forces and Yeltsin assumed the duties of the Supreme Commander.

In May 1992, General Colonel Pavel Grachev became the Minister of Defence, and was made Russia's first Army General on assuming the post. By August or December 1993 CIS military structures had become CIS military cooperation structures with all real influence lost.

In the next few years, Russian forces withdrew from central and eastern Europe, as well as from some newly independent post-Soviet republics.  While in most places the withdrawal took place without any problems, the Russian Armed Forces remained in some disputed areas such as the Sevastopol naval base in the Crimea as well as in Abkhazia, South Ossetia and in Transnistria. The Armed Forces have several bases in foreign countries, especially on territory of the former Soviet Republics.

On 24 February 2022 Russian president Vladimir Putin gave the execute order to for the Armed Forces to begin the 2022 Russian invasion of Ukraine. On 10 April 2022 General Aleksandr Dvornikov assumed command of the operation. In July 2022, at the same time as the Armed Forces began suffering severe casualties, the Ground Forces began to site ammunition in or near structures which are frequented by civilians due to the human shield benefit, ostensibly because Ukrainian HIMARS had tilted the odds of his strategy of attrition by artillery. Within hours after Defence Minister Sergei Shoigu's signature on the UN-brokered deal to resume Ukraine’s Black Sea grain exports, Russia bombed the Port of Odesa.

According to Forbes Moscow had committed, as of the end of July 2022, 10 of its Combined Arms Armies to the invasion.

Structure

The Defence Ministry of the Russian Federation serves as the administrative body of the Armed Forces. Since Soviet times, the General Staff has acted as the main commanding and supervising body of the Russian armed forces: U.S. expert William Odom said in 1998, that 'the Soviet General Staff without the MoD is conceivable, but the MoD without the General Staff is not.'

Other departments include the Main Intelligence Directorate, the personnel directorate as well as the Rear of the Armed Forces of the Russian Federation, Railway Troops, Signal Troops and Construction Troops. The Chief of the General Staff is currently General of the Army Valery Gerasimov.

Since 1 December 2012, the structure of the Ministry of defence has been containing the Main Directorate of the Military Police, to which all military district's regional directorates of military police are subordinated.

In July 2018, the Main Military-Political Directorate of the Russian Armed Forces was created, restoring a responsibility for ideological training that had been done away with in the Soviet Armed Forces.

The Russian military is divided into three services: the Russian Ground Forces, the Russian Navy, and the Russian Aerospace Forces. In addition there are two independent arms of service: the Strategic Missile Troops and the Russian Airborne Troops.  The Armed Forces as a whole are traditionally referred to as the Army (armiya), except in some cases, the Navy is specifically singled out.

Military districts

Since late 2010, the Ground Forces as well as the Aerospace Forces and Navy are distributed among four military districts: Western Military District, Southern Military District, Central Military District, and the Eastern Military District which also constitute four Joint Strategic Commands—West, South, Central, and East. Previously from 1992 to 2010, the Ground Forces were divided into six military districts: Moscow, Leningrad, North Caucausian, Privolzhsk-Ural, Siberian and Far Eastern, with the seventh military district: Kaliningrad formed in 1997; in service until 2010.

Russia's four naval fleets and one flotilla were organizations on par with the Ground Forces' Military Districts. These seven MDs were merged into the four new MDs, which now also incorporate the aerospace forces and naval forces. There is one remaining Russian military base, the 102nd Military Base, in Armenia left of the former Transcaucasus Group of Forces and is incorporated into the Southern Military District.

In mid-2010 a reorganisation was announced which consolidated military districts and the navy's fleets into four Joint Strategic Commands (OSC).
In 2014 the Northern Fleet was reorganized in separate Joint Strategic Command. Since 1 January 2021, this Command has the status of military district.

 
Geographically divided, the five commands/districts are:
 Joint Strategic Command West – Western Military District (HQ in St. Petersburg), includes the Baltic Fleet;
 Joint Strategic Command North – Northern Military District (HQ in Severomorsk), includes the Northern Fleet;
 Joint Strategic Command South – Southern Military District (HQ in Rostov-on-Don) includes the Black Sea Fleet and Caspian Flotilla;
 Joint Strategic Command Center – Central Military District (HQ in Yekaterinburg);
 Joint Strategic Command East – Eastern Military District (HQ in Khabarovsk), includes the Pacific Fleet.
The plan was put in place on 1 December 2010 and mirrors a proposed reorganisation by former Chief of the General Staff Army General Yuri Baluyevsky for a Regional Command East which was not implemented. The four commands were set up by a decree of President Medvedev on 14 July 2010. In July 2011, an Operational-Strategic Command of Missile-Space Defence has also been established on the basis of the former Special Purpose Command of the Russian Air Force. A Presidential decree of January 2011 named commanders for several of the new organisational structures.

Russian security bodies not under the control of the Ministry of Defence include the Internal Troops of the Ministry of Internal Affairs (now the National Guard of Russia's National Guard Forces Command), the Border Guard Service of Russia (part of the Federal Security Service), the Kremlin Regiment and the rest of the Federal Protective Service, and the Ministry of Emergency Situations, the country's civil defence service since 1995 and successor to earlier civil defence units.

Naval fleets

The Navy consists of four fleets and one flotilla:
Northern Fleet (HQ at Severomorsk) forms own Joint Strategic Command.
Baltic Fleet (HQ at Kaliningrad in the exclave of Kaliningrad Oblast) subordinated to Joint Strategic Command West.
Black Sea Fleet (HQ at Sevastopol, disputed region of Crimea) subordinated to Joint Strategic Command South.
Pacific Fleet (HQ at Vladivostok) subordinated to Joint Strategic Command East.
Caspian Flotilla (HQ at Astrakhan) subordinated to Joint Strategic Command South.

The Kaliningrad Special Region, under the command of the Commander Baltic Fleet, comprises Ground & Coastal Forces, formerly the 11th Guards Army and now the 11th Army Corps with a motor rifle division HQ (formed in 2021) and subordinate units, as well as naval aviation regiments employing Sukhoi Su-27 'Flankers' and other combat aircraft. As noted, both the Baltic Fleet and the 11th Army Corps in Kaliningrad are subordinate to Strategic Command West.

Similarly, the Northeast Group of Troops and Forces, headquartered at Petropavlovsk-Kamchatskiy, comprises all Russian Armed Forces components in the Kamchatka Krai and the Chukotka Autonomous Okrug [district] and is subordinate to the Commander Pacific Fleet headquartered in Vladivostok.

Personnel

Conscription is used in Russia; the term of service is 12 months; and the eligible age is between 18 and 27 years old. Deferments are provided to undergraduate and graduate students, men supporting disabled relatives, parents of at least two children and—upon Presidential proclamation—to some employees of military-oriented enterprises. Men holding a Ph.D., as well as sons and brothers of servicemen killed or disabled during their military service, are released from conscription.

There were widespread problems with hazing in the Army, known as dedovshchina, where first-year draftees are abused by second-year draftees, a practice that appeared in its current form after the change to a two-year service term in 1967. According to Anna Politkovskaya, in 2002, "a complete battalion, more than five hundred men, had been killed not by enemy fire but by beatings". Over a period of 9 months in 2003, 2,500 personnel were accused of dedovshchina, of which half were sentenced. To combat this problem, a new decree was signed in March 2007, which cut the conscription service term from 24 to 18 months. The term was cut further to one year on 1 January 2008.

Thirty percent of Russian Armed Forces' personnel were contract servicemen at the end of 2005. For the foreseeable future, the Armed Forces will be a mixed contract/conscript force. The Russian Armed Forces need to maintain a mobilization reserve to have manning resources capable of reinforcing the permanent readiness forces if the permanent readiness forces cannot deter or suppress an armed conflict on their own.

Nearly 400,000 contractors serve in the Russian Army as of March 2019. According to Defence Minister Shoigu, in every regiment and brigade, two battalions are formed by contractors, while one is formed by recruits, who are not involved in combat missions. Currently, there are 136 battalion tactical groups in the armed forces formed by contractors. The number of conscripts amounts to 225,000 and the number of contractors amounts to 405,000 as of March 2020 and exceeds the number of conscripts by 2 times as of the end of 2021.

Recruitment into the Russian military are also open to non-Russian citizens of the Commonwealth of Independent States, of which Russia is the largest member. By December 2003, the Russian parliament had approved a law in principle to permit the Armed Forces to employ foreign nationals on contract by offering them Russian citizenship after several years service yet, up to 2010, foreigners could only serve in Russia's armed forces after getting a Russian passport. Under a 2010 Defence Ministry plan, foreigners without dual citizenship would be able to sign up for five-year contracts and will be eligible for Russian citizenship after serving three years. The change could open the way for CIS citizens to get fast-track Russian citizenship, and counter the effects of Russia's demographic crisis on its army recruitment. Each soldier in duty receives an Identity Card of the Russian Armed Forces.

Awards and decorations of the Armed Forces are covered at the Awards and Emblems of the Ministry of Defence of the Russian Federation.

On 17 November 2011, General Nikolai Makarov said that Russia had reached a crisis in the conscript service where there simply were not sufficient able bodied men to draft and was forced to halve its conscription. Military draft dodging declined 66% since 2012 and as of March 2019. It is reported that about 80% of the young people who were drafted into the ranks of the Russian Armed Forces in the autumn of 2018 were found fit for military service. According to the head of the mobilization, in recent years, the fitness of future recruits has increased by 7%.

In March 2013, Defence Minister Sergey Shoygu promised that all army quarters would have showers by the end of the year. RIA also said that the shower plans were the latest in a series of creature-comfort improvements the Defence Ministry had recently announced. In mid-January, Shoygu said he would rid the army of its antiquated "footwraps," or portyanki, and a few days later the designer of Russia's new army uniform said that the ear-flap hats traditionally worn in winter would be replaced with more modern headgear. The Russian military's ushanka hats were improved between 2013 and 2015, when the Russian armed forces were being equipped with new uniforms. The new version of the traditional - and somewhat stereotypical - hat features better heat insulation and longer ear flaps.

A new uniform for hot climates was introduced in mid-2018.

On 28 May 2022, on the background of the ongoing invasion of Ukraine, Vladimir Putin signed the law which removed the upper age limit for signing first contract for the performance of voluntary military service (earlier this limit was 40 years old).

Military education

The Russian military education system, inherited from the Soviet Union, trains officer-specialists in narrowly-defined military occupational specialties. In this it differs greatly from the American military education system in which newly-qualified second lieutenants receive particular specialties in the framework of their "career branch" only after graduation from a military academy or the ROTC. Students of Russian civilian institutions of higher education wishing to join the reserve officer training program can’t choose a military occupational specialty, because each civilian specialty taught by civilian university is attached to a particular military occupational specialty taught by the military training center of the same university by the rector's order. It also differs from the American military education system in which students can choose between available types of ROTC.

The Russian military education system includes:
 Warrant officer schools, which prepare career warrant officers for active duty service.
 Higher military schools, which prepare career commissioned officers for active duty service as platoon/company commanders and at equivalent positions (tactical level).
 Military training centers within civilian institutions of higher education, which prepare reserve commissioned officers who can serve as platoon/company commanders and at equivalent positions (tactical level).
 Military academies, which improve the military occupational specialty knowledge of commissioned officers to allow them to be appointed to battalion/regiment/brigade commander or equivalent positions (operational-tactical level).
 Military Academy of the General Staff of the Armed Forces of Russia, which improves skills of officers graduated from military academies to allow them to become highest ranking military officers (strategic level).
 Adjunctura is a military analogue of civilian graduate school, which allow commissioned officers to get academic degree of candidate of sciences in military oriented specialties and be appointed to a teaching positions in military academies, military schools, military training centers.

Reserve components
Russian Armed Forces have reserves (Russian: запас; transliteration: zapas) which includes 2 components:
 Active reserve - Mobilization human reserve (Russian: мобилизационный людской резерв; transliteration: mobilizatsionnyy lyudskoy reserv)
 Inactive reserve - Mobilization human resource (Russian: мобилизационный людской ресурс; transliteration: mobilizatsionnyy lyudskoy resurs)

By default, at the end of active duty each military personnel is enrolled as a mobilization human resource. This applies equally to conscripts and volunteers regardless of ranks. Furthermore, graduates of civilian institutions of higher education, who have graduated the military training centers of their almae matres, trained under reserve officer program, are enrolled as mobilization Human Resources after their promotion to officer's rank (unlike graduates of such centers, trained under active duty officer program, who are due to be enrolled for active duty after their promotion to officer's rank). Mobilization human resource are replenished with males who reach the age of 27 years old and were not in military service for any reason.

Enrolling in the mobilization human reserve is voluntary and implies the special contract. This possibility is available for each persons, who is in the mobilization human resource already. The initial contract is concluded for 3 years period. Military personnel of mobilization human reserve (reservists) perform part-time duties in military units. Reservists are appointed to a military position in particular military units and are involved in all operational, mobilization, and combat activities of these military units. As a rule, in peacetime time reservists perform their duties 2–3 days per month and during an annual military camp training of 20 to 30 days.

The exact number of reservists is unknown because a relevant paragraph of the Presidential Decree which determines the number of reserve troops is classified. The military units manned by reservists are determined by General Staff of the Armed Forces of the Russian Federation, and this information is classified too.

The persons who are in mobilization human resource (non-reservists) may be enlisted to military camp trainings in peacetime. The duration of each training can not exceed 2 months, herewith the total duration of such trainings for the entire period of being in mobilization human resource can not exceed 12 months, and a person may be enlisted in such training no more than once every three years.

As of 2009, the number of citizens who can be used for mobilization deployment on an involuntary basis in the case of wartime mobilization was estimated at 31 million.

Reservists are subject to mobilization in wartime first of all. Non-reservists are subject to mobilization secondarily. The mobilization of non-reservists is carried out by taking into account the age category under the article 53 of Federal Law of 28 March 1998, No.53-FZ "About military duty and military service": in order from first category to third category.

The first category includes: 1) the persons at the any military rank below that of a commissioned officer (enlisted personnel) and not reached the age of 35 years old; 2) the persons at the any rank from junior lieutenant to captain (captain-lieutenant in naval service) inclusively (junior commissioned officers) and not reached the age of 50 years old; 3) the persons at the any rank from major (captain 3rd rank in naval service) to lieutenant colonel (captain 2nd rank in naval service) inclusively and not reached the age of 55 years old; 4) the persons at the rank of colonel (captain 1st rank in naval service) and not reached the age of 60 years old; 5) the persons at the rank of major general (counter admiral in naval service) or higher (supreme officers) and not reached the age of 65 years old.

The second category includes: 1) enlisted personnel in age from 35 but less than 45; 2) junior commissioned officers in the age from 50 but less than 55; 3) commissioned officers at the any rank from major (captain 3rd rank in naval service) to lieutenant colonel (captain 2nd rank in naval service) inclusively in the age from 55 but less than 60; 4) commissioned officers at the rank of colonel (captain 1st rank in naval service) in the age from 60 but less than 65; 5) supreme officers in age from 65 but less than 70.

The third category includes: 1) enlisted personnel in the age from 45 but less than 50; 2) junior commissioned officers in the age from 55 but less than 60; 3) commissioned officers at the any rank from major (captain 3rd rank in naval service) to lieutenant colonel (captain 2nd rank in naval service) inclusively in the age from 60 but less than 65; 4) all females in the age less than 45 for enlisted personnel and less than 50 for commissioned officers. The person who has reached the age limit, established for the third category (the second category for persons at the rank of colonel (captain 1st rank in naval service) or higher), is retired and is not subject to mobilization.

2005–2008 reform of the reserve officer training system

The reserve officer training system, inherited from the Soviet Union, involved selective conscription of graduates of civilian institutions of higher education, who have graduated the military departments of their almae matres and received a commission as an officer. Such person could be conscripted from the reserve of armed forces to active duty, up until the age of 27. The period of active duty of such an officer was several years, and at the end of that period he was due to be enlisted in the reserve of armed forces again. Such officers were called "blazers" in the army's slang (for example, Anatoly Kvashnin was a "blazer").

In 2005, minister of defence Sergei Ivanov announced a significant reduction in the number of military departments carrying out the training commissioned officers from students of civilian institutions of higher education. By March 2008, 168 of 235 civilian universities, academies and institutions which previously had military departments had lost these units. 37 of 67 civilian universities, academies and institutions which retained military departments became the basis for the establishment of new military training centers. The military training centers focused on training officers for active duty, whilst the military departments focused on training officers for the reserve.

In 2006 the conscription of reserve officers was abolished. Graduates of military departments were not subject to conscription to active duty anymore (with the exception of a wartime mobilization). All graduates of  military training centers were due to be enrolled for 3 years active duty upon their university graduation.

2018 beginning of formation of voluntary military reserve force

In 2018, Russia started a full-scale formation of a military reserve force based upon volunteers selected from among those who retired from active duty. The Russian military reserve force is a set of citizens who have signed a contract to perform military service as a reservist. They are appointed to a military position in a particular military unit. They are involved in all operational, mobilization, and combat activities of these military units, unlike other citizens who haven't signed such contracts and who can be used for a mobilization deployment of armed forces on an involuntary basis only in cases stipulated by law.

The deployment of military units composed of reservists, takes minimum time and does not requires any retraining of military personnel. The military units composed of reservists use the same weapons as used by military units, composed of active duty military personnel. Military units staffed by reservists are 100% manned up to wartime standards just like military units staffed by active duty military personnel only. There is no possibility to define by military units designation what we're dealing with - reserve or not reserve military unit. The number of reservists is not presented in open sources and is not among the number of active duty military volunteers which is published by Ministry of Defence. This makes it difficult for establish real troop strength of new Russian military units and formations.

2019 reform of the reserve officer training system

In 2018 the military departments and the military training centers were abolished. From that moment on, students of civilian institutions of higher education were trained under both officers training programmes (for reserve and for active duty) in the Military Training Centers. In 2019, there were training military centers in 93 civilian institutions of higher education.

Mobilization
The first mobilization of citizens being in mobilization human resource, conducted on a compulsory basis, in the Russian Federation's history was announced by Presidential Decree of 21 September 2022 №647 during the Russian invasion of Ukraine.

Budget

Between 1991 and 1997 newly independent Russia's defence spending fell by a factor of eight in real prices. In 1998, when Russia experienced a severe financial crisis, its military expenditure in real terms reached its lowest point—barely one-quarter of the USSR's in 1991, and two-fifths of the level of 1992, the first year of Russia's independent existence.

In the early 2000s, defence spending increased by at least a minimum of one-third year-on-year, leading to overall defence expenditure almost quadrupling over the past six years, and according to Finance Minister Alexei Kudrin, this rate is to be sustained through 2010. Official government military spending for 2005 was US$32.4 billion, though various sources, have estimated Russia's military expenditures to be considerably higher than the reported amount.

Estimating Russian military expenditure is beset with difficulty; the annual IISS Military Balance has underscored the problem numerous times within its section on Russia. The IISS Military Balance comments, "By simple observation ... [the military budget] would appear to be lower than is suggested by the size of the armed forces or the structure of the military–industrial complex, and thus neither of the figures is particularly useful for comparative analysis." By some estimates, overall Russian defence expenditure is now at the second highest in the world after the USA. According to Alexander Kanshin, Chairman of the Public Chamber of Russia on affairs of veterans, military personnel, and their families, the Russian military is losing up to US$13 billion to corruption every year.

On 16 September 2008 Russian Prime Minister Vladimir Putin announced that in 2009, Russia's defence budget would be increased to a record amount of $50 billion.

On 16 February 2009 Russia's deputy defence minister said state defence contracts would not be subject to cuts this year despite the ongoing financial crisis, and that there would be no decrease in 2009. The budget would still be 1.376 trillion rubles and in the current exchange rates this would amount to $41.5 billion.

Later in February 2009, due to the world financial crisis, the Russian Parliament's Defence Committee stated that the Russian defence budget would instead be slashed by 15 percent, from $40 billion to $34 billion, with further cuts to come. On 5 May 2009, First Deputy Prime Minister Sergei Ivanov said that the defence budget for 2009 will be 1.3 trillion rubles (US$39.4 billion). 322 billion rubles are allocated to purchase weapons, and the rest of the fund will be spent on construction, fuel storage and food supply.

According to the head of the Defence Committee of the State Duma Vladimir Komoyedov, Russia plans to spend 101.15 billion rubles on nuclear weapons in 2013–2015. "The budget provisions under 'The Nuclear Weapons Complex' section in 2013-2015 will amount to 29.28 billion rubles, 33.3 billion rubles and 38.57 billion rubles respectively," Komoyedov said, Vechernaya Moskva reports.

Komoyedov added that in 2012 the spending on nuclear weapons made up 27.4 billion rubles. The draft law "On the Federal Budget for 2013 and for the planning period of 2014 and 2015" will be discussed in the first reading on 19 October 2012, The Voice of Russia reports. In a meeting in Sochi in November 2013, President Putin said the country's defence budget will reach 2.3 trillion roubles, stressing the huge amount in comparison to the 2003 budget, which stood on 600 billion rubles.

The Russian government's published 2014 military budget is about 2.49 trillion rubles (approximately US$69.3 billion), the fourth largest in the world behind the US, China and Saudi Arabia. The official budget is set to rise to 3.03 trillion rubles (approximately US$83.7 billion) in 2015, and 3.36 trillion rubles (approximately US$93.9 billion) in 2016. As of 2014, Russia's military budget is higher than any other European nation, and approximately 1/7th (14 percent) of the US military budget.

In 2015, SIPRI found that Russia was the world's second biggest exporter of major weapons for the period 2010–14, increasing exports by 37 per cent. India, China and Algeria accounted for almost 60 percent of total Russian exports. Asia and Oceania received 66 percent of Russian arms exports in 2010–14, Africa 12 percent and the Middle East 10 percent.

In 2017, Russia was reported to have slashed its defense spending by 20%, due to calls by Vladimir Putin to spend money on other initiatives such as healthcare and education. The cut decreased Russia's military spending to $66.3 billion, in which Russia slumped to being the fourth-highest military spender. Russia's 2019 defense budget was US$48 billion and the 2020 figure was $61.7 billion.

Procurement

About 70 percent of the former Soviet Union's defence industries are located in the Russian Federation. Many defence firms have been privatised; some have developed significant partnerships with firms in other countries.

The recent steps towards modernization of the Armed Forces have been made possible by Russia's economic resurgence based on oil and gas revenues as well a strengthening of its own domestic market. Currently , the military is in the middle of a major equipment upgrade, with the government in the process of spending about $200 billion (what equals to about $400 billion in PPP dollars) on development and production of military equipment between 2006 and 2015 under the State Armament Programme for 2007–2015 (GPV – госпрограмма вооружения).

Mainly as a result of lessons learned during the Russo-Georgian War, the State Armament Programme for 2011–2020 was launched in December 2010. Prime Minister Putin announced that 20–21.5 trillion rubles (over $650 billion) will be allocated to purchase new hardware in the next 10 years. The aim is to have a growth of 30% of modern equipment in the army, navy and air force by 2015, and of 70% by 2020. In some categories, the proportion of new weapon systems will reach 80% or even 100%.

At this point, the Russian MoD plans to purchase, among others, up to 250 ICBMs, 800 aircraft, 1,200 helicopters, 44 submarines, 36 frigates, 28 corvettes, 18 cruisers, 24 destroyers, 6 aircraft carriers, and 62 air defence battalions. Several existing types will be upgraded.

In total since 2012 and as of 2017, the Armed Forces received more than 30,000 units of new and modernized weapons and equipment, including more than 50 warships, 1,300 aircraft, over 1,800 drones, 4,700 tanks and armored combat vehicles compared to two warships, 151 aircraft and 217 tanks received in 2007–2011. The Russian army also receives 150–250 aircraft per year and over 300 short-range UAVs.

As of 2011, Russia's chief military prosecutor said that 20 percent of the defence budget was being stolen or defrauded yearly. It is suspected that equipment is not properly maintained due to the resulting lack of funds, which may have contributed to equipment failures observed during the 2022 invasion of Ukraine.

In 2018, RF Armed Forces adopted 35 types of weapons and military equipment and completed state tests of 21 more. The Russian Ministry of Defence (MoD) was procured the YeSU TZ (Yedinaya Sistema Upravleniya Takticheskogo Zvena) battlefield management system that same year. The YeSU TZ battlefield management system incorporates 11 subsystems that control artillery, electronic warfare systems, ground vehicles, air defence assets, engineering equipment, and logistics support, among other things.

Twelve missile regiments have been rearmed with Yars ICBMs, 10 missile brigades with Iskander tactical ballistic missile systems, 13 aviation regiments with MiG-31BM, Su-35S, Su-30SM, and Su-34 combat aircraft, three army aviation brigades and six helicopter regiments with Mi-28N and Ka-52 combat helicopters, 20 surface-to-air missile (SAM) regiments with S-400 Triumf SAM systems, 23 batteries with Pantsir-S self-propelled anti-aircraft gun-missile systems, and 17 batteries with Bal and Bastion mobile coastal defence missile systems [MCDMSs] since 2012 and as of March 2019.

Since 2012 and as of April 2021, the Ground Forces have received more than 15,500 pieces of weapon systems and equipment and rearmed all missile brigades with the Iskander tactical ballistic missile system. Aerospace Force and naval aviation have received over 1,500 aircraft and helicopters and the Navy more than 190 ships, vessels and boats.

Since 2012 and as of December 2020, the number of long-range land-, sea-, and air-launched cruise missiles increased by 37 times. The number of their cruise missile carriers was also increased by 13 times.

In late 2022, the Russian Defense Minister Sergey Shoigu claimed that supplies of major weapons in the outgoing year had risen by 30%, while the amount of ammunition for rocket, artillery and aircraft systems increased by 69% to 109%. The Chief of Russian Armed Forces General Staff Valery Gerasimov also claimed that his troops had received more than 3,100 armored, rocket-artillery and other weapons including aviation systems and upgraded gunships.

Nuclear weapons

As of January 2017, the Federation of American Scientists estimated that Russia has approximately 1,765 deployed strategic warheads, and another 2,700 non-deployed strategic and deployed and non-deployed tactical warheads, plus an additional 2,510 warheads awaiting dismantlement. Russia's Strategic Rocket Forces controls its land-based nuclear warheads, while the Navy controls the submarine based missiles and the Aerospace Forces the air-launched warheads. Russia's nuclear warheads are deployed in four areas:

 Land-based immobile (silos), like R-36 and its replacement RS-28 Sarmat.
 Land-based mobile, like RT-2PM2 Topol-M and new RS-24 Yars.
 Submarine based, like R-29RMU2 Layner and RSM-56 Bulava.
 Air-launched warheads of the Russian Air Forces' Long Range Aviation Command

The military doctrine of Russia sees NATO expansion as one of the threats for the Russian Federation and reserves the right to use nuclear weapons in response to a conventional aggression that can endanger the existence of the state. In keeping with this, the country's nuclear forces received adequate funding throughout the late 1990s.  The number of intercontinental ballistic missiles and warheads on active duty has declined over the years, in part in keeping with arms limitation agreements with the U.S. and in part due to insufficient spending on maintenance, but this is balanced by the deployment of new missiles as proof against missile defences.

Russia has developed the new RT-2PM2 Topol-M (SS-27) missiles that a Russian general claimed to be able to penetrate any missile defence, including the planned U.S. National Missile Defence. The missile can change course in both air and space to avoid countermeasures. It is designed to be launched from land-based, mobile TEL units.

Because of international awareness of the danger that Russian nuclear technology might fall into the hands of terrorists or rogue officers who it was feared might want to use nuclear weapons to threaten or attack other countries, the federal government of the United States and many other countries provided considerable financial assistance to the Russian nuclear forces in the early 1990s. This money went in part to finance decommissioning of warheads under international agreements, such the Cooperative Threat Reduction programme, but also to improve security and personnel training in Russian nuclear facilities.

In the late evening of 11 September 2007 the fuel-air explosive AVBPM or "Father of All Bombs" was successfully field-tested.

See also
 Military academies in Russia
 Military commissioning schools in Russia
 Reserve Officer Training in Russia
 Warrant officer schools of the Russian Armed Forces
 Adjunctura in Russia
 Awards and emblems of the Ministry of Defence of the Russian Federation
 Uniforms of the Russian Armed Forces
 Military Band Service of the Armed Forces of Russia
 History of Russian military ranks
 Army ranks and insignia of the Russian Federation
 Naval ranks and insignia of the Russian Federation

Notes

Citations 

Dara Massicot, What Russia Got Wrong, Foreign Affairs, 2023

References 

 Andrew Bowen, "Russian Armed Forces: Capabilities ," Congressional Research Service, June 30, 2020.
 "How are the mighty fallen". The Economist. 2–8 July 2005. pp. 45–46.
 Russia Creates Unique Rifle That Can Shoot at Four Kilometres RNS, November 2016
 
 Keir Giles, Military Service in Russia: No New Model Army, Conflict Studies Research Centre, May 2007
 
 International Institute for Strategic Studies, The Military Balance, various editions

Further reading
 
 Galeotti, Mark, 'Organised crime and Russian security forces: mafiya, militia and military', Journal of Conflict, Security and Development, issue 1:2, 2001.
 Ivanov, Henry, 'Country Briefing: Russia—Austere deterrence', Jane's Defence Weekly, 28 April 2006
 
 Pynnöniemi, K., 'Russia's Defence Reform: Assessing the real "Serdyukov heritage"' , FIIA Briefing Paper 126, 26 March 2013, The Finnish Institute of International Affairs.
 Turbiville, G., 'Organized crime and the Russian armed forces', Transnational Organized Crime, vol. 1, issue 4, 1995, pp. 55–73;
Waters, T., 'Crime in the Russian military', CSRC Paper C90, (Camberley: Conflict Studies Research Centre, 1996).

External links

 Russian Ministry of Defense  (in English)
 Russian Military Capabilities in a 10 year perspective (PDF) 2013 study by the Swedish Defence Research Agency
 Russia's military modernisation - Putin's new model army by The Economist, 24 May 2014
 Just How Dangerous is Russia's Military? by The National Interest 15 July 2016 by Nikolas Gvosdev
 
 Russia's New Army study from 2011 by the Centre for Analysis of Strategies and Technologies
 Russia's Military: Assessment, Strategy, and Threat report by the Center on Global Interests
 Russia's shiny new weapons an article about Russian drones by Mark Galeotti, 10 January 2014